Lauricius is a genus of North American false wolf spiders that was first described by Eugène Louis Simon in 1888.  it contains two species, found in the United States and Mexico: L. hemicloeinus and L. hooki. Originally placed with the sac spiders, it was transferred to the Zoropsidae in 1967.

See also
 List of Zoropsidae species

References

External links
Information on Lauricius hooki found in New Mexico

Araneomorphae genera
Spiders of Mexico
Spiders of the United States
Zoropsidae